Statistics of Swiss National League A in the 1989–90 football season.

Overview
It was contested by 12 teams, and Grasshopper Club Zürich won the championship.

First stage

Table

Results

Second stage

Championship group

Table
</onlyinclude>

Results

Promotion/relegation group

Group A

Table

Results

Group B

Table

Results

See also
1989 Klötzli incident

Sources
 Switzerland 1989–90 at RSSSF

Swiss Football League seasons
Swiss
1989–90 in Swiss football